Oollo Pelliki Kukkala Hadavidi, also known as Oo Pe Ku Ha, is a 2018 Telugu-language comedy film, produced by Smt. Bhagyalakshmi on JB Creations banner and directed by Nidhi Prasad. Starring Rajendra Prasad and  Sakshi Chaudhary, the film has music composed by Anup Rubens.

Cast

Rajendra Prasad
Sakshi Chaudhary
Brahmanandam
Ali
Venu Madhav
L. B. Sriram
Rishi
Krishna Bhagawan
Benerjee
Surya
Jeeva 
Amith
Ravi Prakash
Raghu Karumanchi
Krishnudu
Khayyum
Hemanth
Saikumar Pampana 
Dhanraj 
Jyothi

Soundtrack

Music composed by Anup Rubens. Lyrics were written by Kandikonda. Music released on ADITYA Music Company.

References

External links
 

2018 films
Indian comedy films
Films scored by Anoop Rubens
2018 comedy films